Princess Laurentien of the Netherlands (Petra Laurentien; née Brinkhorst; born 25 May 1966) is the wife of Prince Constantijn and sister-in-law of King Willem-Alexander and Queen Máxima.

Early life

Petra Laurentien Brinkhorst was born in Leiden, Netherlands on 25 May 1966, the daughter of the former Dutch minister of Economic Affairs, Laurens Jan Brinkhorst and Jantien Brinkhorst-Heringa. She has one brother. She is known by her middle name, Laurentien, a portmanteau of her parents' given names.

Princess Laurentien started primary school in Groningen. Her family then moved to The Hague, where she completed her primary education. She attended her secondary education in The Hague, of which four years at the Christelijk Gymnasium Sorghvliet and one year at the Eerste Vrijzinnige Christelijk Lyceum, and later in Kita, Tokyo at the Lycée Français International de Tokyo, where she obtained her Baccalauréat diploma in 1984. Her father was working in Japan at the time, being the Ambassador of the European Union to Japan between 1982 and 1987.

Princess Laurentien studied history at the University of Groningen, where she completed her Propaedeutics in 1986. She then studied at Queen Mary College, University of London where she received a BA degree in political science in 1989, and subsequently at the University of California, Berkeley where she obtained an MJ degree in 1991.

Interests and activities
In 2009, she was designated UNESCO Special Envoy on "Literacy for Development" in recognition of her "outstanding commitment to the promotion of education and her profound dedication to the Organization's ideals and objectives". In 2010 she was co-recipient of the Major Bosshardt Prize for her work in combating illiteracy.

She is also the current president of wildlife conservation NGO Fauna and Flora International.

Marriage and children
The engagement of Prince Constantijn and Laurentien Brinkhorst was announced on 16 December 2000. The civil marriage was conducted by Wim Deetman, the mayor of the Hague, in the Oude Raadzaal, Javastraat, the Hague, on 17 May 2001. The church wedding took place two days later on 19 May in the Grote of St Jacobskerk, with Reverend Carel ter Linden officiating.

Prince Constantijn and Princess Laurentien have three children: Eloise (born 2002), Claus-Casimir (born 2004), and Leonore (born 2006).

In 2015, Prince Constantijn, Princess Laurentien, and their children moved from Brussels to The Hague.

Titles, styles, and honours

Titles and styles
Laurentien's full title and style is: Her Royal Highness Princess Petra Laurentien of the Netherlands, Princess of Orange-Nassau, Mrs. van Amsberg.

Laurentien was not legally created a princess, but custom allows a wife to use her husband's titles. All children of the marriage hold the titles Count or Countess of Orange-Nassau and Jonkheer or Jonkvrouw van Amsberg.

By Royal Decree of 15 January 2003, nr. 36, Princess Laurentien was granted her own personal standard.

Honours

National honours
 :
 Dame Grand Cross of the Order of the House of Orange
 Recipient of the Royal Wedding Medal 2002 (2 February 2002)
 Recipient of the King Willem-Alexander Investiture Medal (30 April 2013)

Foreign honours 
 : Dame Grand Cross of the Order of the Crown (28 November 2016)
 : Dame Grand Cordon of the Supreme Order of the Renaissance (30 October 2006)

References

External links
The Dutch Royal House | Princess Laurentien
UNESCO on Literacy (official website)

1966 births
Living people
House of Orange-Nassau
Princesses by marriage
Princesses of Orange-Nassau
People from Leiden
Alumni of Queen Mary University of London
Grand Crosses of the Order of the House of Orange
Grand Crosses of the Order of the Crown (Belgium)
Amsberg
UC Berkeley Graduate School of Journalism alumni